Cromek is a surname. Notable people with the surname include:

 Robert Cromek (1770–1812), English engraver, editor, art dealer, and entrepreneur 
 Thomas Hartley Cromek (1809–1873), English artist, son of Robert

See also
 Cromer (surname)